Broadnose skate (Bathyraja brachyurops) is a species of skate in the family Arhynchobatidae. This fish occurs on 28 to 604 meters, mostly at depths shallower than 250 meters, from Valdivia and Estrecho de Magallanes to Argentina and the Falkland Islands. It has the maximum total length of about 125 centimeters which it reaches in about 20 years. Both sexes reach maturity at age 8–10 years.

References

 

Bathyraja
Taxa named by Henry Weed Fowler
Fish described in 1910